Fiscus was the name of the personal treasury of the emperors of Rome. In modern times it refers to revenue from taxation.

Fiscus may also refer to:
Fiscus, Iowa, an unincorporated community in Audubon County
SS Fiscus, a UK cargo steamship that was built in 1928

Fiscus as a surname
Jim Fiscus
Kathy Fiscus
Lawson Fiscus
Ross Fiscus
Thomas J. Fiscus